De Kustpijl is a cycling race held annually in Belgium. It is part of UCI Europe Tour in category 1.2.

Winners

References

Cycle races in Belgium
UCI Europe Tour races
Recurring sporting events established in 1962
1962 establishments in Belgium